Hsinbyumashin (22 November 1821 – 26 February 1900) was a senior queen of King Mindon Min during the Konbaung dynasty. She was the daughter of King Bagyidaw and his consort Nanmadaw Me Nu
(Chief Queen of King Bagyidaw). She was one of the most influential queens in Burma (Myanmar).

Life
Hsinbyumashin was born as Shwe Nanshin Me on 22 November 1821 to King Bagyidaw by his queen Nanmadaw Me Nu. She was granted the appanages of Sagaing and Singu after her birth. When her mother Me Nu was executed with attempts to seize the throne by King Tharrawaddy, Princess Setkya Dewi saved her life and took her home.

Later, she was wedded to Mindon Min, the penultimate king, who made her the high-ranking "Queen of the Central Palace". Her full regnal title upon ascending the throne was Sīripavaratiloka Mahārājindādhipati Padumaratanādevī (သီရိပဝရတိလောက မဟာရာဇိန္ဒာဓိပတိ ပဒုမရတနာဒေဝီ). On 25 November 1877, she received the title Hsinbyumashin, which translates to "mistress of the white elephants," upon receiving a white elephant named Sīrimahāsubhatta from King Mindon. King Mindon and Hsinbyumashin had seven children, but they did not survive– only Supayagyi, Supayalat and Supayalay were alive.

Hsinbyumashin dominated the last days of King Mindon. She orchestrated the massacre of upward of 100 members of the royal family and ordered the killing of almost all possible heirs to the throne so that her daughter Supayalat and son-in-law Thibaw Min would become queen and king. The ambitious Hsinbyumashin, after placing Thibaw on the throne, offered her oldest daughter Supayagyi, to be his queen. During the royal aggamahesi coronation, Supayalat pushed in next to her sister to be anointed queen at the same time, breaking ancient custom. 

When Thibaw ascended the throne, she was granted the appanages of several territories including Amyint prefecture, Salin, Talok, Bhamo and Wuntho. The female lineage of Hsinphyumashin, her mother Nanmadaw Me Nu, and her daughter Supayalat in the male dominated Burmese monarchy is a very interesting one regarding the end of Independence and the monarchy.

Exile 

The Konbaung dynasty reign lasted just seven years when Thibaw Min was defeated in the Third Anglo-Burmese War and forced to abdicate by the British in 1885. On 25 November 1885, the royal family were taken away in a covered carriage, leaving Mandalay Palace by the southern gate of the walled city along the streets lined by British soldiers and their wailing subjects, to the River Irrawaddy where a steamboat called Thuriya (Sun) awaited. Hsinbyumashin and her daughter, Supayagyi, were sent to Tavoy (now Dawei). She died in Rangoon, British Burma on 26 February 1900. Her remains were interred at the Mandalay Palace enclosure (see Konbaung tombs).

In popular culture
Portrayed by Patcharapa Chaichua in 2017 Thai soap opera Plerng Phra Nang was loosely based on Hsinbyumashin'''s life and Some Burmese cultures and traditions are used in drama
Portrayed by San Shar Tin in 1997 Burmese film Never Shall We Be Enslaved''

See also
Konbaung dynasty
Supayalat
Mindon Min

References

Queens consort of Konbaung dynasty
1821 births
1900 deaths
Burmese Buddhists